The Longkaikou Dam is a gravity dam on the Jinsha River in Dali Bai Autonomous Prefecture, Yunnan province, China. Construction on the dam began in 2007, the river was diverted in January 2009 but construction was briefly halted in June 2009 by the Ministry of Environmental Protection after it was being constructed without approval. On 25 November 2012 the reservoir was impounded and the first of five 360 MW Francis turbine-generators was commissioned on 21 May 2013. The last was commissioned on 29 November 2013. The dam was expected to displace 2,000 people. The dam also supports a fish proliferation system.

See also 

 List of power stations in China

References

Hydroelectric power stations in Yunnan
Dams completed in 2013
Dams in China
Dams on the Jinsha River
Gravity dams
Energy infrastructure completed in 2013
Roller-compacted concrete dams
2013 establishments in China
Buildings and structures in Dali Bai Autonomous Prefecture